Brissac (Languedocien: Briçac) is a commune in the Hérault department in southern France.

Population

Sights
Castle (11th century), rebuilt in the early 16th century.
Parish church of Saint-Nazaire et Saint-Celse (12th century)
Church of Notre-Dame du Suc
Chapel of Saint-Etienne d'Issensac. Nearby is the medieval Bridge  of Saint-Étienne d'Issensac (14th century).

See also
Communes of the Hérault department

References

Communes of Hérault